= Addis Video Art Festival =

Video art festival in Addis Ababa, Ethiopia

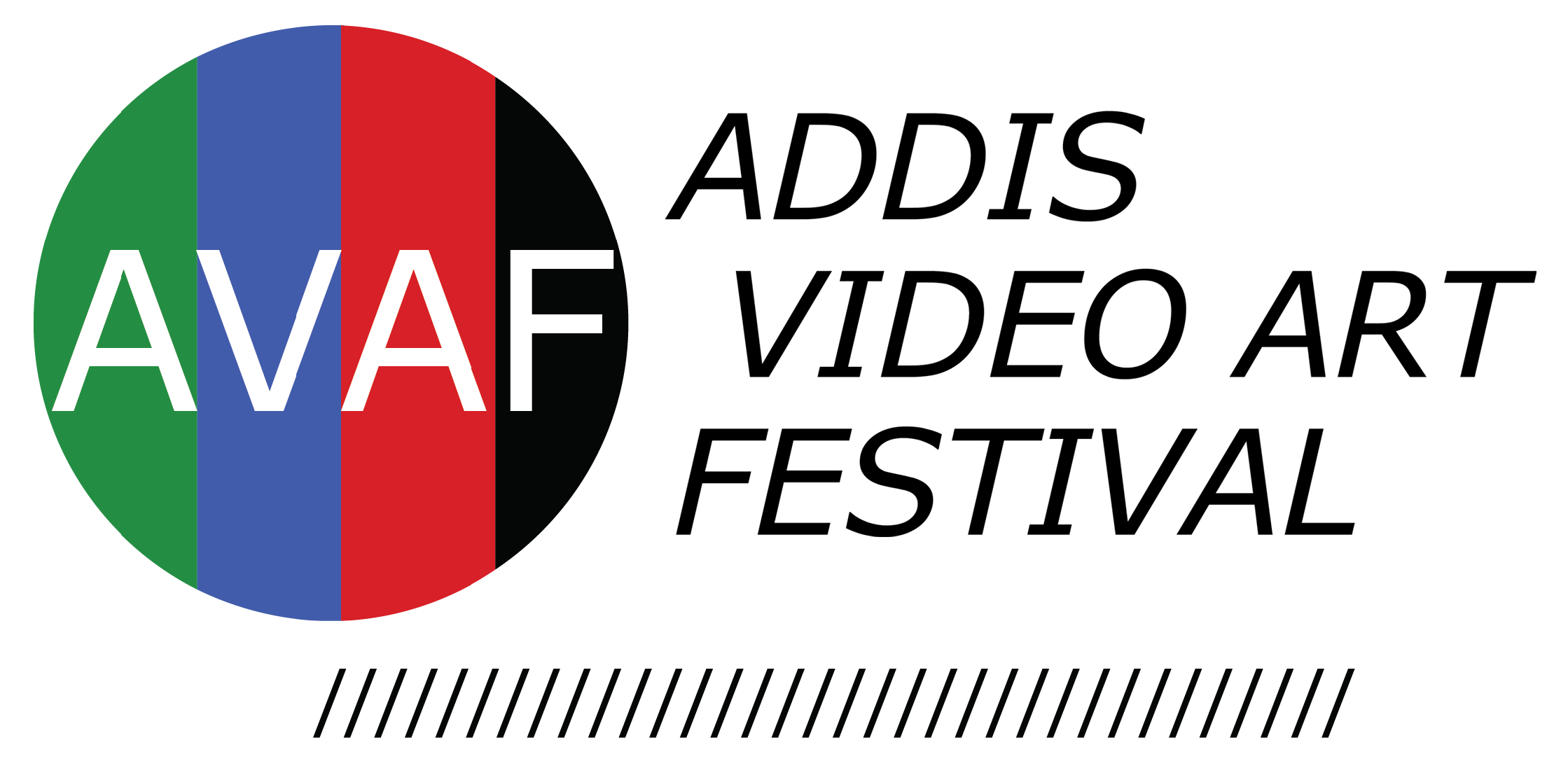

Addis Video Art Festival is an annual international video art festival in Addis Ababa, Ethiopia.

Addis Video Art Festival intends to provide a platform for innovative video art in Addis Ababa, Ethiopia. The festival will screen throughout the city in a variety of locations including street corners, rooftops, public centers and art centers. By sharing video art in both conventional and non-conventional settings, the festival will reach both the artist community and the everyday passerby. The festival aims to create a dialogue between local, and international artists by promoting and encouraging digital media culture.
